German contract law is found in the Bürgerliches Gesetzbuch, in both the "Allgemeine Teil" and the chapter on "Schuldrecht". It forms part of the general law of obligations.

See also
Abstraktionsprinzip
Drittwirkung

Contract
Contract law